The Socialist Front was a political coalition in Thailand, formed by leftwing parties in late 1956. The main group in the coalition was the Economist Party, led by Thep Chotinuchit. The other two constituents of the Socialist Front were the Free Democratic Party and the Hyde Park Movement Party. Thep Chotinuch was the chairman of the Socialist Front. The parliamentarians who founded the Socialist Front came from northeast Thailand. The Socialist Front favoured a neutralist foreign policy, and called for Thai withdrawal from SEATO.

In the 1975 general election the Socialist Front won ten seats, all of them from the northeast. In total the Socialist Front got 3.8 percent of the nationwide vote.

References

Defunct political parties in Thailand
1956 establishments in Thailand
Defunct political party alliances in Asia
Socialist parties in Thailand

th:พรรคแนวร่วมสังคมนิยม